"The Hunted" is the 11th episode of the third season of the syndicated American science fiction television series Star Trek: The Next Generation, and the 59th episode of the series overall.

Set in the 24th century, the series follows the adventures of the Starfleet crew of the Federation starship Enterprise-D. In this episode, as Captain Picard (Patrick Stewart) and his staff meet with the leaders of the planet Angosia III who are petitioning for Federation membership, they find themselves learning more than expected about the Angosians when they offer to help capture a local escaped prisoner.

Plot
The Enterprise is investigating the planet Angosia III as a candidate for entry into the Federation. Captain Picard (Patrick Stewart) is approached by Prime Minister Nayrok (James Cromwell), who asks for help in apprehending a convict who has escaped on a transport ship from their prison colony on Lunar V. The Enterprise locates the ship, which flies behind an asteroid. However, only the drive section emerges from the other side with no life signs. Following it around they find the ship's wreckage. Believing that the prisoner has perished, the ship begins course back to the planet, only to discover the drive section they saw has disappeared.

Picard and Commander Riker (Jonathan Frakes) return to the Enterprise and following a hunch from Data (Brent Spiner) locate an escape pod and beam aboard the prisoner. When security try to take the prisoner into custody he fights back, virtually unaffected by their phasers. He overpowers the guards and injures O'Brien (Colm Meaney) before he is subdued. Upon further examination the crew find that the prisoner does not emit any life signs on scanner.

The prisoner identifies himself as Roga Danar (Jeff McCarthy) a former soldier. Counselor Troi (Marina Sirtis) meets Danar and reads little aggression from him, finding it unlikely that he could be so violent. Danar explains that he and others were genetically enhanced, greatly increasing their abilities and affecting their responses when in danger. The crew also finds that despite being a prisoner Danar has no criminal record. Nayrok confirms Danar's story but says that the soldiers were unsuited for life in civilized society. When Captain Picard raises the subject with Nayrok, he refuses to discuss the abuses Danar alleges, considering it a matter of internal security, and instead simply arranges for Danar to be returned to the colony. Danar tells Troi that the conditioning was never reversed or treated, and due to its effects a small misunderstanding could often lead to murder. Rather than try to fix the conditioning, the government imprisoned them all.

During the transfer from the Enterprise to the Angosian transport, Danar manages to escape. Easily evading security, he cripples the Enterprise by causing an explosion in one of the Jeffries tubes, disabling her sensor systems. With the Enterprise blind Danar beams aboard the Angosian transport vessel. Taking control, he attacks the Lunar V colony and rescues several of his fellow inmates.

Danar and the other inmates lead an attack on the capital and confront the Angosian government. Nayrok pleads with the Enterprise to help. Picard beams down with an away team but refuses to help, questioning the morality of how they've treated their soldiers. Nayrok and his compatriots explain the government's view on the matter; that the soldiers' augments cannot be reversed, thus requiring them to be confined for their own good and perhaps used again in the future. Against this, Picard is frustrated at their intransigence on this matter.

In the middle of this argument, Danar and his rebels storm the government building. In an act of hypocrisy, Nayrok pleads with Picard to intervene against this insurrection. Picard elects instead to depart considering he has sufficient information for his report, including the flagrant sentient rights abuses discovered, reminding Nayrok that he himself called the matter an internal affair.

With Nayrok fruitlessly protesting against their being abandoned, Picard informs the government that they have to make a choice on what to do with their veterans. Danar smiles at the away team, happy to finally be recognized as they depart. On their return to the Enterprise, Picard notes that if the government survives, they will be given assistance in helping their veterans with their conditioning. He also notes that they may reapply to join the Federation at a later date.

Releases
The episode was released with Star Trek: The Next Generation season three DVD box set, released in the United States on July 2, 2002. This had 26 episodes of Season 3 on seven discs, with a Dolby Digital 5.1 audio track. It was released in high-definition Blu-ray in the United States on April 30, 2013.

The episode was released in Japan on LaserDisc on July 5, 1996, in the half season set Log. 5: Third Season Part.1 by CIC Video. This included episodes up to "A Matter of Perspective" on 12-inch double sided optical discs. The video was in NTSC format with both English and Japanese audio tracks.

Reception 
In a 2010 re-view, Zack Handlen gave the episode a grade A.

Keith R.A. DeCandido gave the episode a rating of 6 out of 10.

In 2016, Vox rated this one of the top 25 essential episodes of all Star Trek.

References

 Star Trek The Next Generation DVD set, volume 3, disc 3, selection 3

External links

 

Star Trek: The Next Generation (season 3) episodes
1990 American television episodes
Television episodes directed by Cliff Bole